Marradi is a comune (municipality) in the Metropolitan City of Florence in the Italian region Tuscany, located about  northeast of Florence at the borders with the Emilia-Romagna region.

Marradi borders the following municipalities: Borgo San Lorenzo, Brisighella, Dicomano, Modigliana, Palazzuolo sul Senio, Portico e San Benedetto, San Godenzo, Tredozio, Vicchio.

Main sights
 
Chiesa di Santa Maria Nascente (1112) 
Chiesa di San Ruffillo 
Hermitage of San Pier Damiani
Badia di Santa Reparata (Badia del Borgo)
Chiesa di San Lorenzo (Marradi)
Communal Palace
Palazzo Fabbroni

People
Serafino Razzi (1531-1613)
Dino Campana (1885-1932)
Vincenzo Castaldi (1916-1970)
Anna Anni (1926-2011)

References

External links

 Official website

Cities and towns in Tuscany